Strong School District was a school district headquartered in Strong, Arkansas.

It operated Strong Elementary School and Strong High School.

On July 1, 2004, it consolidated with the Huttig School District to form the Strong-Huttig School District.

References

Further reading
 These maps include predecessor districts
 Map of Arkansas School Districts pre-July 1, 2004
 (Download)

External links
 

Defunct school districts in Arkansas
School districts disestablished in 2004
2004 disestablishments in Arkansas
Education in Union County, Arkansas